TTY may refer to:

Communications and technology
 Teleprinter or teletypewriter (TTY), an electromechanical typewriter paired with a communication channel
 Sometimes used more generally for any type of computer terminal
 May also used to refer to a virtual console in Unix-like operating systems
 Another name for a telecommunications device for the deaf (TDD), a teleprinter designed for persons with hearing or speech difficulties
 tty (Unix), a command found in Unix-like operating systems

Other uses
 Tampere University of Technology (Tampereen Teknillinen Yliopisto), in Finland
 Torque-to-yield fastener